The Estonian Athletic Association (Estonian: Eesti Kergejõustikuliit) is the governing body for the sport of athletics in Estonia.

An Estonian athlete, Nikolai Vedehin, was accused of doping by The International Association of Athletics Federations (IAAF). He was temporarily banned from competing in any events. Nikolai was found to have the forbidden substance Trimetazidine in his urine sample which was taken in Kenya on February 5, 2015. Nikolai admitted to taking the drug but claimed he was not aware that it was prohibited during while he was not competing. This was a statement he gave in writing when he provided the original urine sample. The president of the Estonian Athletics Association, Erich Teigamagi stated that it was difficult to examine the matter substantively at the time as Nikolai was not in Estonia at the time. Nikolai notified the Estonian Athletics Association that he was ready to cooperate with them in the probe.

In another statement Erich Teigamagi said "Together with IAAF, the World Anti-Doping Agency and Antidoping Estonia are working consistently to combat banned substances and methods. The Estonian Athletics Association is working closely with IAAF and Antidoping Estonia."

Affiliations 
World Athletics
European Athletic Association (EAA)
Estonian Olympic Committee

National records 
EKJL maintains the Estonian records in athletics.

See also 
Estonian Championships in Athletics

References

External links 
Official website

National members of the European Athletic Association
Athletics
National governing bodies for athletics
Sports organizations established in 1920
1920 establishments in Estonia
Athletics in Estonia